Psathyrella is a large genus of about 400 species, and is similar to the genera Coprinellus, Coprinopsis, Coprinus and Panaeolus, usually with a thin cap and white or yellowish white hollow stem. The caps do not self digest as do those of Coprinellus and Coprinopsis. Some also have brown spores rather than black. These fungi are often drab-colored, difficult to identify, and all members are considered inedible or worthless (for eating) and so they are often overlooked. However they are quite common and can occur at times when there are few other mushrooms to be seen. The first report of a gilled mushroom fruiting underwater is Psathyrella aquatica.

The genus name Psathyrella is a diminutive form of Psathyra, derived from the Greek word ψαθυρος, psathuros 'friable'.  The type species of Psathyrella is Psathyrella gracilis, which is now known as Psathyrella corrugis.

Characteristics
In order to identify the species it may be necessary to take into account the presence and nature of any veil remnants on cap (which may only be visible on very young fruiting bodies), the colour of young fruiting bodies, which is often more vivid than with older ones, whether the cap is hygrophanous (it can well be a translucent brown or ochre colour in a humid state but a pure opaque white on drying out), and the spore size and the presence and nature of cheilocystidia, pleurocystidia and caulocystidia, distinctive sterile cells on the gill face, gill edge and stipe respectively.  All Psathyrella species are unusually fragile, and both the cap and stem break with very little effort.  Unlike most agarics, the caps of Psathyrella species easily break into triangular shaped pieces.

Selected species

For complete list see List of Psathyrella species

 Psathyrella ammophila (dune brittlestem)
 Psathyrella aquatica
 Psathyrella bipellis
 Psathyrella candolleana (pale brittlestem)
 Psathyrella corrugis (red edge brittlestem) (type sp., older synonym of Psathyrella gracilis)
 Psathyrella piluliformis / Psathyrella hydrophila (common stump brittlestem)

References

Marcel Bon : The Mushrooms and Toadstools of Britain and North-Western Europe (Hodder & Stoughton, 1987).

External links

The North American species of Psathyrella by Alexander H. Smith, 1972. (Full text of monograph.)

Psathyrellaceae
Inedible fungi
Agaricales genera
Taxa named by Elias Magnus Fries